Analía Almeida  (born 19 August 1985) is a former female Argentine football forward.

Playing career
She was part of the Argentina women's national football team at the 2008 Summer Olympics. On club level she played for San Lorenzo de Almagro.

See also
 Argentina at the 2008 Summer Olympics

References

External links
FIFA.com
http://www.alamy.com/stock-photo-japans-kyoko-yano-top-and-argentinas-analia-almeida-fight-for-the-119954782.html
http://www.lfpress.com/sports/soccer/2012/01/17/19257931.html

1985 births
Living people
Argentine women's footballers
Argentina women's international footballers
Place of birth missing (living people)
Footballers at the 2008 Summer Olympics
Olympic footballers of Argentina
Women's association football forwards
2007 FIFA Women's World Cup players